Madison Michelle Pettis (born July 22, 1998) is an American actress. She is known for her roles as Sophie Martinez on the Disney Channel comedy series Cory in the House, as Peyton Kelly in the 2007 film The Game Plan, and as Allie Brooks in the 2011 Canadian comedy series Life with Boys.

Early life 
Madison Michelle Pettis was born on July 22, 1998, in Arlington, Texas. Her father is African American and her mother is of Italian, French, and Irish descent.

Career 
Pettis was first noticed when her mother entered into an annual cover search held by FortWorthChild, a local parenting magazine. Early in her career Pettis appeared on Barney & Friends as Bridget, in 2005 and 2006, in which she sang, danced and acted.

Pettis won her first major role in 2006 when she was cast as Peyton Kelly, the long-lost daughter of Dwayne Johnson's quarterback character, in the 2007 Disney film The Game Plan. In 2007 Pettis was cast as Bailey Bryant, the sister of Corbin Bleu's character, in the 2008 film Free Style. In 2008, she had a small role in Dr. Seuss' Horton Hears a Who!, and had a role in A Muppets Christmas: Letters to Santa. She also had a small role as Lorena in the 2008 Will Smith film Seven Pounds. Pettis starred in the 2008 direct-to-video film
Mostly Ghostly: Who Let the Ghosts Out?, and its 2014 sequel Mostly Ghostly: Have You Met My Ghoulfriend?, playing the role of ghost Tara Roland.

Pettis starred in Cory in the House as Sophie, the president's daughter, and appeared in one episode of Hannah Montana playing the same role. She portrayed Isabelle Tyler in an episode of The 4400. She was the 2007 Disney Channel Games commentator, and had a voice role in the Disney Channel animated series Special Agent Oso. In 2009, Pettis appeared as herself on the syndicated version of the game show Are You Smarter than a 5th Grader?

In 2011, Pettis landed two main roles: the voice role of Izzy on the animated series Jake and the Never Land Pirates; and Allie Brooks on the Canadian television series Life with Boys. In 2012, she began a recurring role on the Disney XD series Lab Rats. On October 19, 2014, Pettis confirmed via Facebook that she would be guest starring in The Fosters. In 2015, she was cast in a voice role in the Disney Channel animated series The Lion Guard and its television movie precursor The Lion Guard: Return of the Roar.

Filmography

Film

Television

References

External links 

 
 

1998 births
Living people
People from Arlington, Texas
American people of French descent
American people of Irish descent
American people of Italian descent
African-American actresses
American television actresses
American film actresses
American child actresses
Actresses from Texas
21st-century American actresses
21st-century African-American women
21st-century African-American people